The plain honeyeater (Pycnopygius ixoides) is a species of bird in the family Meliphagidae.
It is found in Indonesia and Papua New Guinea.
Its natural habitat is subtropical or tropical moist lowland forests.

References

Pycnopygius
Birds described in 1878
Taxonomy articles created by Polbot